Rolf van der Vlugt (born 27 October 1981) is a Dutch professional kite surfer.

In July 2012 he won the bronze medal in the Slalom World Championships, finishing behind Julien Kerneur and Maxime Nocher.

Achievements
Source:
2008
 PKRA World Tour Port Saint Louis (kite cross)
2010
 PKRA World Tour Sankt Peter-Ording (kite cross)
 PKRA World Tour Fuerteventura (kite cross)
2011
4th PKRA World Tour Thailand (kite cross)
6th PKRA World Tour Sankt Peter-Ording (kite cross)
2012
 World Championships (slalom)

References

External links
PKRA Profile

1981 births
Living people
Dutch kitesurfers
Male kitesurfers